Saint-Augustin is a municipality and settlement in Le Golfe-du-Saint-Laurent Regional County Municipality in the Côte-Nord region of Quebec, Canada, known by its large English-speaking population as St. Augustine. Its territory stretches along the Gulf of Saint Lawrence, whereas the settlement itself is located on a peninsula in the Saint Augustin Bay at the mouth of the Saint-Augustin River. On the opposite shore of this river is the Innu settlement of Pakuashipi.

The majority of its inhabitants are Métis, descendants of Inuit and Europeans, many of whom still practice subsistence activities such as hunting, fishing, wood cutting, trapping and wild berry gathering, using both traditional and modern technologies.

History
The area was originally inhabited by Innu and Inuit tribes, who were mostly displaced once Europeans began to exploit the area. In the late 17th century, a French post may have been established on Vieux Poste Island. Circa 1720, a trading post was established around which the settlement formed. It was first identified as Saint-Augustin–Saguenay, named after Augustin le Gardeur de Courtemanche (1663–1717) who in 1702 was granted the land concession "from the river called Kegaska up to the one named Kesesakion" for a period of 10 years and who was the King's Commander of the Labrador coast in 1714.

The place experienced a slow growth until the lower North Shore was opened to settlement circa 1820, attracting English, American, Quebec, and Newfoundland fishing families to its rich stocks of seal, salmon and cod. They mixed with the remaining indigenous people, and their descendants, the Métis, occupied at one point some 40 different fishing communities on the shores of the area's numerous islands and bays, including Spoon Cove, Anse du Portage, Havre Saint-Augustin, and Ile Saint-Augustin. In 1870, the trading post, then owned by the Hudson's Bay Company, was rebuilt and became the site of thriving hunting, fishing, and trading business. In 1893, its post office opened.

By 1986, Saint-Augustin had 833 inhabitants. It separated from the Municipality of Côte-Nord-du-Golfe-du-Saint-Laurent and was incorporated as the Municipality of Saint-Augustin in 1992, becoming effective on January 1, 1993.

Demographics

Population

Language

See also
 List of municipalities in Quebec

References

External links
 Lower North Shore Community Web Site

Incorporated places in Côte-Nord
Municipalities in Quebec
Hudson's Bay Company trading posts
Road-inaccessible communities of Quebec